The 2004 Canoe Slalom World Cup was a series of six races in 4 canoeing and kayaking categories organized by the International Canoe Federation (ICF). It was the 17th edition. The series consisted of 5 regular world cup races and the world cup final.

Calendar

Final standings 

The winner of each world cup race was awarded 30 points. Semifinalists were guaranteed at least 5 points and paddlers eliminated in heats received 2 points each. The world cup final points scale was multiplied by a factor of 1.5. That meant the winner of the world cup final earned 45 points, semifinalists got at least 7.5 points and paddlers eliminated in heats received 3 points apiece. Only the best five results of each athlete counted for the final world cup standings.

Results

World Cup Race 1 

The first race of the season was held at the newly built Hellinikon Olympic Canoe/Kayak Slalom Centre in Athens, Greece from 22 to 25 April.

World Cup Race 2 

The second race of the season was held at the Segre Olympic Park in La Seu d'Urgell, Spain from 22 to 23 May.

World Cup Race 3 

The third race of the season was held in Merano, Italy from 29 to 30 May.

World Cup Race 4 

The fourth race of the season was held at the Prague-Troja Canoeing Centre, Czech Republic from 10 to 11 July.

World Cup Race 5 

The fifth race of the season was held at the Augsburg Eiskanal, Germany from 16 to 18 July.

World Cup Final 

The final race of the season was held in Bourg-Saint-Maurice, France from 23 to 25 July.

References

External links 
 International Canoe Federation

Canoe Slalom World Cup
Canoe Slalom World Cup